Harrison, Illinois may refer to:
Harrison, Jackson County, Illinois, a census-designated place in Jackson County
Harrison, Winnebago County, Illinois, an unincorporated community in Winnebago County